Black Methodism in the United States is the Methodist tradition within the Black Church, largely consisting of congregations in the African Methodist Episcopal (AME), African Methodist Episcopal Zion (AME Zion or AMEZ), Christian Methodist Episcopal denominations, as well as those African American congregations in other Methodist denominations, such as the Free Methodist Church.

African Americans were drawn to Methodism due to the father of Methodism, John Wesley's "opposition to the whole system of slavery, his commitment to Jesus Christ, and the evangelical appeal to the suffering and the oppressed."

History

Historically black Methodist denominations

AMEZ 
The African Methodist Episcopal Zion church evolved as a division within the Methodist Episcopal Church denomination. The first AME Zion church was founded in 1800. Like the AME Church, the AME Zion Church sent missionaries to Africa in the first decade after the American Civil War and it also has a continuing overseas presence.

AME 
The African Methodist Episcopal Church was founded by Richard Allen in Philadelphia, Pennsylvania, in 1816, and also split from the white-dominated Methodist Episcopal Church denomination to make an independent denomination. Sarah Allen was known as its "founding mother". It is based in the United States but seven of its 20 districts are overseas, including in Liberia, the United Kingdom, Angola, and South Africa. Its Women's Missionary Service, an NGO, operates in 32 countries.

CME

Other Methodist denominations

Free Methodist Church
In the Free Methodist Church, African Heritage Network convenes to encourage black congregations and clergy within the denomination.

Intercommunion 
Both the AME and the AMEZ churches have entered in full communion with one another and with the United Methodist Church, the African Union Methodist Protestant Church, the Christian Methodist Episcopal Church, and the Union American Methodist Episcopal Church.

List of notable congregations

United States

Liberia
Eliza Turner AME Church, 34 Camp Johnson Road, Monrovia, founded in 1896
Empowerment Temple AME Church, Carey Street, Monrovia
Morning Star AME, Kingsville #7 Township, Careysburg District, Montserrado County.

See also
List of Methodist churches
List of Methodist churches in the United States, which covers all or many of the U.S. ones above, amidst other Methodist churches, and is organized by state

References

External links

 African Methodist Episcopal Church Proceedings #4825-z, Southern Historical Collection, The Wilson Library, University of North Carolina at Chapel Hill.
 Official AME Site

 01
.01
Lists of churches in the United States
History of Methodism in the United States
Black Methodism in the United States